In enzymology, a Delta14-sterol reductase is an enzyme that catalyzes the chemical reaction

4,4-dimethyl-5alpha-cholesta-8,24-dien-3beta-ol + NADP+  4,4-dimethyl-5alpha-cholesta-8,14,24-trien-3beta-ol + NADPH + H+

Thus, the two substrates of this enzyme are 4,4-dimethyl-5alpha-cholesta-8,24-dien-3beta-ol and NADP+, whereas its 3 products are 4,4-dimethyl-5alpha-cholesta-8,14,24-trien-3beta-ol, NADPH, and H+.

This enzyme belongs to the family of oxidoreductases, specifically those acting on the CH-CH group of donor with NAD+ or NADP+ as acceptor.  The systematic name of this enzyme class is 4,4-dimethyl-5alpha-cholesta-8,24-dien-3beta-ol:NADP+ Delta14-oxidoreductase. This enzyme participates in biosynthesis of steroids.

References

 
 

EC 1.3.1
NADPH-dependent enzymes
Enzymes of unknown structure